Chandipur may refer to:

Bangladesh
 Chandipur, Bangladesh, a village in Barisal Division, Bangladesh

India
 Chandipur (community development block), an administrative division in West Bengal
 Chandipur (Vidhan Sabha constituency), an assembly constituency in West Bengal
 Chandipur, Odisha, a resort town in Baleswar District, Odisha, India
 Chandipur, Purba Medinipur, a village, with a police station, in Purba Medinipur district, West Bengal, India

See also
 Chandpur (disambiguation)